The 2021–22 season was Aston Villa's 27th season in the Premier League, third consecutive, and their 108th season at the top flight of English football. It is also their 147th year in history. Along with the league, the club also competed in the FA Cup, being eliminated by Chelsea in the third round, and the EFL Cup, being eliminated by Manchester United in the third round. The season covers the period from the 1st July 2021 to the 30th June 2022.

Players

Current squad

|}

Friendlies
On 2 July 2021, Aston Villa announced their planned pre-season friendlies for the upcoming season. A fifth friendly against Bristol City was later added on July 9. A behind-closed-doors friendly against Crewe Alexandra was organised for 31 July, as a replacement for the cancelled Nottingham Forest match. On 6 August, a friendly against Serie A side Salernitana was organised to replace the cancelled Sevilla match.

Competitions

Overview

Premier League

League table

Results summary

Results by matchday

Matches
The 2021–22 season fixtures were released on 16 June 2021.

FA Cup

Aston Villa entered the FA Cup in the third round. The draw for the third round took place on 6 December 2021 at Old Trafford and ended as a 1–0 loss to Manchester United.

EFL Cup

Villa entered the EFL Cup in the second round stage and were drawn away to Barrow. The third round draw took place on 25 August 2021, and Villa were drawn away to Chelsea later losing 4-3 on penalties.

Transfers

Transfers in

Transfers out

Loans in

Loans out

Squad statistics

Appearances and goals

|-
! colspan=14 style=background:#dcdcdc; text-align:center| Goalkeepers

|-
! colspan=14 style=background:#dcdcdc; text-align:center| Defenders

|-
! colspan=14 style=background:#dcdcdc; text-align:center| Midfielders

 

|-
! colspan=14 style=background:#dcdcdc; text-align:center| Forwards

|-
! colspan=14 style=background:#dcdcdc; text-align:center| Players transferred or loaned out during the season

Goals

Assists
Not all goals have an assist.

Clean sheets

Disciplinary record

Club awards

Player of the Month award 
Voted for by fans on Aston Villa's official website.

Goal of the Month award 
Voted for by fans on Aston Villa's Twitter account.

End of Season awards

See also
 2021–22 in English football
 List of Aston Villa F.C. seasons

References

Aston Villa
Aston Villa F.C. seasons